Astrothalamus is a genus of flowering plants belonging to the family Urticaceae.

Its native range is Northern Borneo to Philippines.

Species:

Astrothalamus reticulatus

References

Urticaceae
Urticaceae genera
Taxa named by Charles Budd Robinson